Anastrophella is a genus of fungi in the family Marasmiaceae.

Species

 A. macrospora E. Horak & Desjardin 1994
 A. podocarpicola Issh. Tanaka
 A. subpeltata (Redhead) E. Horak & Desjardin 1994

See also
List of Marasmiaceae genera

Marasmiaceae
Agaricales genera